Symphyotrichum trilineatum (formerly Aster trilineatus) is a species of flowering plant in the family Asteraceae native from Mexico to Guatemala.

Citations

References

trilineatum
Flora of Mexico
Flora of Guatemala
Plants described in 1844
Taxa named by Carl Heinrich 'Bipontinus' Schultz